Muchka (Quechua for mortar, also spelled Muchca) is a mountain in the Cordillera Central in the Andes of Peru which reaches a height of approximately . It is located in the Lima Region, Yauyos Province, on the border of the districts of Alis and Vitis, northwest of Alis.

References 

Mountains of Peru
Mountains of Lima Region